Serous cystadenoma may refer to:

Ovarian serous cystadenoma, a very common benign tumour of the ovary
Pancreatic serous cystadenoma, also known as serous microcystic adenoma